The Charles Grimes Bridge is a dual-carriageway bridge that carries the Docklands Highway over the Yarra River in the Docklands precinct of Melbourne, Australia. It was named after New South Wales surveyor general Charles Grimes, who was the first European to see the Yarra River.

This crossing of the Yarra River was located approximately 700m downstream of the Spencer Street Bridge, supporting dual four-lane structures; the Country Roads Board (later VicRoads) began construction on the bridge and its approach roads in January 1975. It connected Footscray Road on the northern side of the river to Johnson, Lorimer, Montague and Brady Streets on the south side of the river, and was designed to be compatible with a future extension of the West Gate Freeway. The low clearance of the new bridge over the water would prevent shipping access to wharves and dry-dock facilities upstream, resulting in the closure of a number of the river wharves on the upstream side. The bridge was known during the construction as the Johnson Street Bridge, and was opened under that name by the Acting Minister of Transport, the Hon A H Scanlan MP, on 4 August 1978, with the total cost of the bridge and approach works at approximately $30 million; it was renamed the Charles Grimes Bridge in 1983.

With the Melbourne Docklands redevelopment of the 1990s, Footscray Road was closed as a through-route and rebuilt as Harbour Esplanade, with Wurundjeri Way was constructed to the east as a replacement route. To connect to this new road, Flinders Street was upgraded, and the north end of the Charles Grimes Bridge was rebuilt on an easterly curve to connect to it. Reconstruction started in June 1999, and was completed by 2001.

The bridge superstructure consists of five 33.5m long main spans the river, with five smaller spans between 12m and 24m in length over the existing wharf and riverbank. Each of the bridges carries four traffic lanes in one direction, and a footpath. Computer analysis was required during design due to the complex geometry of the spans.

The Jim Stynes Bridge was opened in 2014 to carry pedestrian and cyclist traffic underneath the Charles Grimes Bridge, to connect the Docklands precinct to the Northbank area.

References 

Bridges in Melbourne
Bridges over the Yarra River
1975 establishments in Australia
Buildings and structures in the City of Melbourne (LGA)
Transport in the City of Melbourne (LGA)
Bridges completed in 1978